Chibiverse is an American animated television series developed by Gino Guzzardo, produced by Disney Television Animation and premiered on Disney Channel on July 30, 2022. The series is based on the studio's Chibi Tiny Tales short series.

Premise 
The series centers on the adventures of "chibi" versions of Disney characters as they live in their own universe. The episodes feature several Chibi Tiny Tales shorts, hosted by specific characters who, unlike the shorts, actually speak. As the hosts introduce themselves and announce the next short, a plot is intertwined throughout these snippets until the episode's conclusion.

Cast 

 Amphibia:
 Brenda Song as Anne Boonchuy
 Justin Felbinger as Sprig Plantar
 Bill Farmer as Hop Pop Plantar
 Amanda Leighton as Polly Plantar
 Keith David as King Andrias Leviathan

 Big City Greens:
 Chris Houghton as Cricket Green
 Marieve Herington as Tilly Green
 Zeno Robinson as Remy Remington

 Descendants:
 Sarah Jeffery as Princess Audrey

 DuckTales:
 Keith Ferguson as Flintheart Glomgold

 Hamster & Gretel:
 Beck Bennett as Hamster

 The Ghost and Molly McGee:
 Ashly Burch as Molly McGee
 Dana Snyder as Scratch

 The Owl House:
 Sarah-Nicole Robles as Luz Noceda

 Phineas and Ferb:
 Vincent Martella as Phineas Flynn
 Dan Povenmire as Dr. Heinz Doofenshmirtz

 The Proud Family and The Proud Family: Louder and Prouder:
 Kyla Pratt as Penny Proud

Production 
In July 2022, Disney Television Animation announced that the series, based on the Chibi Tiny Tales shorts, would premiere on July 30. The show consists of shorts centered on "chibi" versions of characters from various Disney Channel programs such as Amphibia and Phineas and Ferb, as well as Disney Channel films such as Zombies and High School Musical, compiled into a half-hour series. Some shorts are sometimes repeated.

Music 
Rob Cantor and Dan Siegel wrote the theme song, with Cantor performing alongside Baraka May.

Episodes

Release 
Chibiverse premiered on Disney Channel on July 30, 2022. Episode were uploaded to Disney Channel's YouTube channel prior to their television debuts on the same days. The series was added to Disney+ on March 8, 2023.

References

External links 
 
 

2020s American animated comedy television series
2020s American animated television series
2022 American television series debuts
American children's animated comedy television series
Disney Channel original programming
English-language television shows
Television series by Disney Television Animation
Crossover animated television series
Television series by Rough Draft Studios